The Colo Colo–Universidad Católica rivalry is a footballing rivalry between Chilean clubs Colo-Colo and Universidad Católica. It is considered to be one of the biggest rivalry matches in Chile.

Statistics
As of 21 October 2022

References

Football rivalries in Chile
Colo-Colo
Club Deportivo Universidad Católica